Jerry Lee (born 1936) is an American businessman in the radio industry.

Jerry Lee may also refer to:
Jerry C. Lee, academic
Jerry Lee, character in K-9 (film)

See also
Jerry Lee Lewis (1935-2022), American singer, songwriter and pianist
Jerry Lee Wells (1944–2014), American basketball player
Gerry Lee, animal impersonator
Jerry Leigh, musician in Dear Enemy
Jeremy Lee (disambiguation)
Gerald Lee (disambiguation)
Gerard Lee, screenwriter
Jeremiah Lee